Juan José Borrelli (born 8 November 1970 in San Isidro, Buenos Aires) is an Argentine former footballer, who played as a midfielder, and one of the most known Argentine footballers that played in Greece (along with Juan Ramón Rocha).

Career 
Borrelli began his career in the late 1980s in River Plate.

Soon, Greek champions Panathinaikos FC brought him (1991) as the new leader of the team. Although during the first two seasons in the team, Borrelli couldn't show his great potential, mainly because he was homesick, but soon he was transformed into leader in the field and helped Panathinaikos FC to win 1994/1995 double.

His contribution was even greater in 1995/1996 season when he scored 15 goals in the championship and 4 in Champions League leading his team to win the double and reach the UEFA Champions League semifinals and the Argentina national team head coach, Daniel Passarella invited him to wear his country's shirt. He was much-beloved by Panathinaikos fans who nicknamed him "Jota Jota".

As a result, his performances attracted scouters from many European teams and in 1997 he was sold to Spanish team Real Oviedo. In the end of the season he returned to Argentina River Plate and San Lorenzo. In 2000/2001 season played for the Argentine side Tigre FC. The following season Borrelli played for a team in Uruguay called Deportivo Maldonado and in the winter returned to Greece for Akratitos.

During the summer, Juan Jose Borrelli announced his retirement.

Two years after his retirement (2004), Borrelli was signed by River Plate as Youth Team head coach.

External links 
 

1970 births
Living people
People from San Isidro, Buenos Aires
Argentine footballers
Argentina international footballers
1995 Copa América players
Argentine Primera División players
Super League Greece players
La Liga players
Club Atlético River Plate footballers
Panathinaikos F.C. players
Real Oviedo players
San Lorenzo de Almagro footballers
Deportivo Maldonado players
Argentine expatriate footballers
Argentine expatriate sportspeople in Greece
Argentine expatriate sportspeople in Spain
Expatriate footballers in Greece
Expatriate footballers in Spain
Expatriate footballers in Uruguay
A.P.O. Akratitos Ano Liosia players
Argentine football managers
Association football midfielders
Sportspeople from Buenos Aires Province